This is a list of notable Telugu language writers.

A - D 
 Adivi Bapiraju
 Ajjada Adibhatla Narayana Dasu
 Anjaneyulu Kundurti
 Annamacharya
 Gurajada Apparao
Asavadi Prakasarao
 Balagangadhara Tilak Devarakonda
 Bhandaru Acchamamba
 Bhargavi Rao
 Bharago
 C. Narayana Reddy
 Charles Philip Brown
 Chinnayasuri Paravastu
Daasarathi Krishnamacharyulu

E - K 
 Dwivedula Visalakshi
 Duggirala Gopalakrishnayya
 Gudipati Venkata Chalam
 Tenneti Hemalata
 Tikkana
 Gurram Jashuva
 Jakkana
 Keshava Reddy
 Kethu Viswanatha Reddy
 Krishnamacharyulu Dasaradhi
 Kodavatiganti Kutumbarao
 K.Varalakshmi
 Garikapati Narasimha Rao
 Kaloji Narayana Rao

L - N 
 Malladi Venkata Krishna Murthy
Makhdoom Mohiuddin
 Molla
 Nannayya
 Vemana
 Muddupalani
 Nayani Krishnakumari
 Namini Subrahmanyam Naidu

O - R 
 Papineni Sivasankar
 Potturi Vijayalakshmi
 Potana Bammera
 P. Lalita Kumari (Volga)
 Perugu Ramakrishna 
 Puranam Subrahmanya Sarma
 Rajaram Madhurantakam
 Ramaswamy Tripuraneni
 Ramireddy Duvvuru
 Ranganayakamma Muppala
 Samudrala Jr.
 Samudrala Sr.
 singireddy Narayana reddy
 Seethadevi Vasireddy
 Somayajulu Chaganti
 Srirangam Srinivasa Rao
Srinathudu
 Subbanna Madhira Deekshitulu 
Suravaram Pratapareddy 
 Tripuraneni Gopichand
 Tripuraneni Ramaswamy
 Tripuraneni Maharadhi
 Umar Alisha
 Kavisekhara Dr Umar Alisha
 Varalakshmamma, Kanuparti
 Kandukuri Veeresalingam
 Venkata Rao Kavikondala
 Venkateswara Rao Narla
 Viswanatha Satyanarayana
 Vempalli Shariff
 Yaddanapudi Sulochana Rani
Yandamuri Veerendranath

External links 

Telugu